Kesteven County Council was the county council of Kesteven, one of the three Parts of Lincolnshire in eastern England. It came into its powers on 1 April 1889 and was abolished on 1 April 1974. The county council was based at the County Offices in Sleaford. It was amalgamated with Holland County Council and Lindsey County Council to form the new Lincolnshire County Council in 1974.

Chairmen and vice-chairmen

Chairmen 
 1889–98: Sir William Welby-Gregory, 4th Baronet
 1898–1921: Sir John Thorold, 12th Baronet.
 1921–34: Sir Charles Welby, 5th Baronet
 1934–54: Sir Robert Pattinson
 1955–62: F. J. Jenkinson
 1962–67: H. W. N. Fane
 1968–73: J. H. Lewis

Vice-chairmen 
 1889–98: Sir John Thorold, 12th Baronet.
 1898–1904: Sir Hugh Cholmeley, 3rd Baronet.
 1904–09: Valentine Stapleton.
 1909–21: Sir Charles Welby, 5th Baronet.
 1921–34: Robert Pattinson
 1934–37: W. V. R. King-Fane
 1937–40: J. H. Bowman
 1940–55: F. J. Jenkinson
 1955–56: John Cracroft-Amcotts
 1957–62: H. W. N. Fane

Coat of arms
Kesteven County Council received a grant of arms in 1950. The Lincoln green shield bears an ermine pale, representing the Roman Ermine Street which runs the length of the county. This is charged with an oak tree for the ancient forests, among them Kesteven Forest.

The crest shows a heron with a pike in its beak. The dexter supporter is a Roman legionary which recalls the Roman settlements of the county. The sinister supporter is a poacher, recalling the song "The Lincolnshire Poacher", an unofficial anthem of Lincolnshire.

References

Former county councils of England
Local authorities in Lincolnshire
Local education authorities in England